Andrea Benítez may refer to:
 Andrea Benítez (tennis)
 Andrea Benítez (skateboarder)